Yuki Koike may refer to:
Yuki Koike (footballer) (born 1986), Japanese footballer
Yuki Koike (sprinter) (born 1995), Japanese sprinter